Gamezebo (sometimes stylized GameZebo) is a website which reports on and reviews video games. Founded in 2005 by Joel Brodie, it originally focused on casual games before expanding its scope to social games in 2009. After being acquired by the causal game company iWin in 2016, Gamezebo was redesigned and expanded its coverage to PC games. It is based in Walnut Creek, California.

History 
Gamezebo was launched in 2005. It was founded by Joel Brodie, the former head of business development at Yahoo! Games. Brodie found that many video game publications "looked down" on casual games and started the website to review and cover news on the genre. It was billed as the first website which solely covered casual games.

Gamezebo and the Casual Games Association launched the Zeebys in 2007, which were awarded to casual games. In 2008, it held another installment of the Zebbys which was aired on Lifetime and was nominated for a Webby Award for 'Games-Related' websites. It used RSS for its content feed. In 2009, Gamezebo expanded its scope with the growing popularity of social games such as FarmVille (2009). By February 2010, it had a staff and twenty freelance journalists. The website was redesigned in 2014.

In 2015, editor-in-chief Jim Squires told MacRumors that Gamezebo was struggling as larger mobile developers shifted away from traditional advertising. In March 2016, Gamezebo was acquired by casual game company iWin. It launched another redesign shortly after, improving navigation and expanding its coverage to PC games. Gamezebo, Inc. is based in Walnut Creek, California.

Organization
Gamezebo, Inc. is based in Walnut Creek, California. Its editor-in-chief is Jim Squires.

Notable contributors

 Justin McElroy

References

Further reading

External links 
 Official website
 
 The Zeebys (archived)

Video game news websites
Browser-based game websites
Internet properties established in 2005
Video game genre websites